Nebria holtzi is a species of ground beetle in the Nebriinae subfamily that can be found on Mount Erymanthos in Greece.

References

External links
Nebria holtzi at Fauna Europaea

holtzi
Beetles described in 1903
Beetles of Europe
Endemic fauna of Greece
Peloponnese